Flaming may refer to:

 Anything set aflame or on fire
 Flaming (Internet), the act of posting deliberately hostile messages on the Internet
 Flame maple, the striped figures in maple woodwork prized for their beauty
 Fläming, a region in Germany
 Flaming drink, various kinds of fire-ignited alcoholic drinks
 "Flaming" (song), a 1967 song by Pink Floyd from their album The Piper at the Gates of Dawn
 The Flaming Lips, an American music group founded in 1983
 Flaming Pie, an album by Paul McCartney, first released in 1997
 An alternative, British, name for Gassing (textile process)

See also
 
 
 Flame (disambiguation)
 Flamboyant (disambiguation)